Rome Symphony Orchestra (RSO) is a professional U.S. orchestra located in Rome, Georgia. The organization was founded in 1921, disbanded around 1930, and reestablished in 1948.The RSO is currently the oldest symphony in the South.

Conductors
 1921–1930: Paul Nixon
 1930–1948: Organization disbanded
 1948–1976: Helen Dean Rhodes
 1976–1995: John Carruth
 1995–1998: Tristan Foison
 1998–1999: Guest Conductors
 1999–2007: Phillip Rice
 2007–2008: Guest conductors
 2008–2015: Richard Prior
 2015–2016: Dr. Sam Baltzer
 2017- present: Jeffrey Sean Dokken

References

American orchestras
Musical groups established in 1921
Orchestras based in Georgia (U.S. state)